The Whenuakite River is one of the longer rivers on the Coromandel Peninsula, in the Waikato Region of New Zealand's North Island. It flows initially north from its sources close to the peninsula's southeast coast north of Tairua, before turning west to reach the southernmost point of the Whitianga Harbour.

See also
List of rivers of New Zealand

References

Thames-Coromandel District
Rivers of Waikato
Rivers of New Zealand